Bevče is a settlement in the Municipality of Velenje in northern Slovenia. The area is part of the traditional region of Styria. The entire municipality is now included in the Savinja Statistical Region.

Name
The name of the settlement was changed from Bevška vas to Bevče in 1952.

Church
The local church is dedicated to Saint Nicholas. It dates to the 16th century with 18th-century rebuilding.

References

External links
Bevče at Geopedia

Populated places in the City Municipality of Velenje